Lake Ivanhoe may refer to:

Lake Ivanhoe (Florida), a body of water in Orlando, Florida
Lake Ivanhoe (New Hampshire), a body of water
Lake Ivanhoe, Wisconsin, a census-designated place

See also
Ivanhoe Lake, Ontario, Canada